Bekir Aksu (born 1938) is a Turkish wrestler. He competed in the men's Greco-Roman +97 kg at the 1968 Summer Olympics.

References

External links
 

1938 births
Living people
Turkish male sport wrestlers
Olympic wrestlers of Turkey
Wrestlers at the 1968 Summer Olympics
Sportspeople from Yozgat